WHND (89.7 FM) is a radio station licensed to Sister Bay, Wisconsin, United States, serving the Door County area. The station is part of Wisconsin Public Radio (WPR), and broadcasts WPR's "NPR News and Classical Network", consisting of classical music and news and talk programming.

External links
Wisconsin Public Radio

HND
Wisconsin Public Radio
Classical music radio stations in the United States
NPR member stations